In music pattern completion is "the use of a projected set to organize a work over a long span of time" (Wilson 1992, p. 210n5). The compositional technique has been used by Béla Bartók and Igor Stravinsky.

Sources
Wilson, Paul (1992). The Music of Béla Bartók. .

References
Straus, Joseph (1982). "A Principle of Voice Leading in the Music of Stravinsky", Music Theory Spectrum 4, p. 106-124.

Musical composition